Józef Kwiatkowski (born 30 November 1950) is a Polish footballer. He played in seven matches for the Poland national football team from 1974 to 1975.

References

External links
 

1950 births
Living people
Polish footballers
Poland international footballers
Place of birth missing (living people)
Association footballers not categorized by position